In Nepalese politics, the shadow cabinet is the opposition's equivalent of the federal cabinet.

The last shadow cabinet was formed by main opposition party Nepali Congress on 20 May 2019. Congress President and Parliamentary Party Leader Sher Bahadur Deuba formed 21 ministerial-level coordination committees as per Section 9 (5A) of the Congress Statute. The committees function as a shadow cabinet, while the coordinator of each committee functions as a shadow minister.

Members

See also 
Leader of the Opposition
Council of Ministers of Nepal

References

External links
Official website
National Assembly Nepal Website
House of Representative Nepal Website

Politics of Nepal
Government of Nepal
Nepal
Nepal
2015 establishments in Nepal
National legislatures
Parliament of Nepal
Westminster system
Nepal